Moxon may refer to:

People

Sport
 Bill Moxon (1885–1952), Australian rules footballer 
 Martyn Moxon (born 1960), English cricketer
 Owen Moxon (born 1998), English footballer 
 Steve Moxon (born 1987), Australian kickboxer

Other people
 David Moxon (born 1951), Church of England Bishop of Waikato 
 Edward Moxon (1801–1858), British  poet and publisher
 Elizabeth Moxon (fl.1740–1754), English cookery writer
 Joseph Moxon (1627–1691), English hydrographer  to Charles II 
 Kendrick Moxon, lawyer with Moxon & Kobrin and Scientologist
 May Moxon, the stage name of Scottish dancer and choreographer Euphemia Davison (1906–1996)
 Michael Moxon, honorary chaplain to Elizabeth II
 Timothy Moxon (1924-2006), English actor and pilot
 W. Moxon Cook (1857–1917), Australian sports journalist

Fictional
 Lew Moxon, character in the DC Comics Batman series

Other uses
 Moxon & Kobrin, the Church of Scientology's law firm
 Moxon antenna, a rectangular two-element array antenna often homebuilt by amateur radio enthusiasts
 Moxon Huddersfield, a British textile manufacturer of luxury worsted and woollen cloth